Mohamad Satim bin Diman is a Malaysian politician and the former member of the Selangor State Assembly representing Puchong from 1995 to 2004 and Seri Serdang from 2004 to 2013.

Election results 
{| class="wikitable" style="margin:0.5em ; font-size:95%"
|+ Selangor State Legislative Assembly Percentage figures based on total turnout.  
!|Year
!|Constituency
!colspan=2|
!|Votes
!|Pct
!colspan=2|Opponent(s)
!|Votes
!|Pct
!Ballots cast
!Majority
!Turnout
|-
|rowspan=2|1995
|rowspan=3|N29 Puchong, P96 Serdang|rowspan=2  | 
|rowspan=2| Mohamad Satim Diman (UMNO) 
|rowspan=2 align="right"|18,516 
|rowspan=2| 72.86%| |
|Nadarasa Muthuthamby (DAP)
|align="right" | 5,749
| 22.62%
|rowspan=2| 26,252
|rowspan=2| 12,767
|rowspan=2| 75.53%
|-
| |
|Abdul Sani Ali (PAS)
|align="right" | 1,149
| 4.52%
|-
|1999
| | 
|Mohamad Satim Diman (UMNO) 
|align="right"| 17,861 
| 58.08%| |
|Yaakob Sapari (KeADILan)
|align="right" | 12,890
| 41.92%
| 32,173
| 4,971
| 74.67%
|-
|rowspan=2|2004
|rowspan=6|N29 Seri Serdang, P103 Puchong|rowspan=2  | 
|rowspan=2| Mohamad Satim Diman (UMNO) 
|rowspan=2 align="right"|17,923 
|rowspan=2| 70.16%| |
|Yaakob Sapari (KeADILan)
|align="right" | 7,378
| 28.88%
|rowspan=2| 26,014
|rowspan=2| 10,545
|rowspan=2| 65.55%
|-
| |
|Mazli Mansor (IND)
|align="right" | 246
| 0.96%
|-
|2008
| | 
|Mohamad Satim Diman (UMNO) 
|align="right"| 18,932 
| 50.06%| |
|Ahmad Idzam Ahmad (PAS)
|align="right" | 18,887
| 49.94%
| 38,799
| 45
| 77.98%
|-
|rowspan=2|2018
|rowspan=2  | 
|rowspan=2| Mohamad Satim Diman (UMNO) 
|rowspan=2 align="right"|12,725 
|rowspan=2| 28.05%
| |
|Siti Mariah Mahmud (AMANAH)
|align="right" | 27,088| 59.71%|rowspan=2| 46,054
|rowspan=2| 14,363
|rowspan=2| 87.18%
|-
| |
|Noor Hanim Ismail (PAS)
|align="right" | 5,552
| 12.24%
|}

 Honours 
  :
  Knight Companion of the Order of Sultan Salahuddin Abdul Aziz Shah (DSSA) – Dato'''' (1997)

References 

Living people
People from Selangor
Malaysian people of Malay descent
Malaysian Muslims
United Malays National Organisation politicians
Members of the Selangor State Legislative Assembly
21st-century Malaysian politicians
Year of birth missing (living people)